Androtion can refer to a number of different people of classical antiquity:
Androtion, a Greek orator
Androtion (historian), a writer on history
Androtion (writer), a writer on agriculture